Richard Garnett may refer to:

Richard Garnett (philologist) (1789–1850), British philologist, author and librarian
Richard Garnett (writer) (1835–1906), British biographer and poet
Richard B. Garnett (1817–1863), American general
Richard W. Garnett (born 1968), American legal scholar